The Pickup Artist is a 2019 Indian Hindi-language thriller film, directed by Rohit Arora. The film stars Dev Chauhan, Vijay Kumar Dogra, Pankaj Uniyal and Anahita Bhooshan as lead characters. The music of the film is done by Bonnie Chakraborty and it is produced by Rohit Arora and Pankaj Uniyal, under the Banner of Roar Picture Company.

The film premiered at the 2019 WorldFest-Houston International Film Festival and was released in theatres on 16 October 2020. The film was released on MX Player on 28 January 2021.

Plot 
The film revolves around the perception of a Psycho Killer. It is based on the sequence of a crime that occurs in the metro city of Delhi. A girl goes missing and many links are attached to each other. The case is handed over to a maniac policeman named Tiger Tiwari (Dev Chauhan). Its story revolves around a matter of missing girls in Delhi and a passionate policeman.

Cast 
 Siddharth Bhardwaj as Siddharth Bharadwaj
 Anahita Bhooshan as Chahat
 Aanchal Chauhan as Mukti
 Dev Chauhan as Tiger Tiwari
 Gandharv Dewan as Shyam
 Vijay Kumar Dogra as Sharmaji
 Dhruv Khurana as Sid
 Jasneet Kooner as Elena
 Vaibhav Kumar as Kanhaiya
 Saurabh Madaan
 Lokesh Mittal as Lalaram
 Samapti Patra as Aastha
 Smriti Sahni as Sapna
 Vivek Sinha as  Crazy Baba
 Akanksha Tyagi
 Saasha Aery
 Pankaj Uniyal as Pankaj

Marketing and release 
The Pickup Artist was released in theatres on 16 October 2020. It is one of the first films to release in Indian cinemas, as theatres reopened after seven months of lockdown due to the COVID-19 pandemic in India. The film was released on the OTT platform MX Player on 28 January 2021.

Reception 
The Times of India mentions a 4.4 out of 5 ratings.
Mayur Lookhar from BeyondBollywood.com gave two-and-a-half of five, saying, "This neo-noir was proving too hot for our taste buds." The Newspost.live reports that the film received great reviews online with the audience calling it "Awesome new age cinema, breaking barriers," while others call it "out of the box! Picture Perfect."

Awards and recognition 
The film was selected to be a part of WorldFest-Houston International Film Festival, the world's oldest independent film festival, in March 2019. The Pickup Artist won two Gold Remi Awards at the 2019 WorldFest-Houston.

In February 2019, the film was selected to be a part of the East x Northeast International Film Festival in New York. It was nominated for Best Feature Film at the East X Northeast. It was the first Indian film to be selected in the Cinefantasy International Fantastic Film Festival in Brazil.

See also 
 List of Bollywood films of 2019

References

External links 
 

2019 thriller films
Films shot in India
2019 films
2010s Hindi-language films
Indian thriller films